Occupation of Kharkiv may refer to:

 Occupation of Kharkiv (1917), occupied by Russian Bolsheviks during the Ukrainian-Soviet War
 German occupation of Kharkiv, occupied by Nazi Germany during World War II
 Russian occupation of Kharkiv Oblast, occupied by Russia during its 2022 invasion of Ukraine

See also
Battle of Kharkiv (disambiguation)
Kharkiv Operation (disambiguation)
Kharkiv (disambiguation)
Kharkov (disambiguation)